"Nervous System" is a song by English post-punk band Killing Joke. It was released in 1979 by Island Records as the band's debut single, shortly after the release of their Turn to Red EP.

Release 

"Nervous System" originally appeared on the band's debut EP, Turn to Red. It was then released in December 1979 on 7" vinyl by Island Records as the band's debut single. Both promo and non-promo versions of the single were released by Island Records with different cover art. The non-promo featured the same album cover as the Almost Red EP, while the promo featured an Island Records factory cover. The single did not chart.

Track listing 
7"

 Side A

 "Nervous System" – 4:10

 Side B

 "Turn to Red" – 4:10

12"

 Side A

 "Almost Red"
 "Nervous System"

 Side B

 "Are you Receiving"
 "Turn to Red"

References 

1979 debut singles
Killing Joke songs
1979 songs
Songs written by Jaz Coleman
Songs written by Paul Ferguson
Songs written by Geordie Walker
Songs written by Youth (musician)
Island Records singles